Jean Bochart de Champigny, Sieur de Noroy et de Verneuil, chevalier (after 1645 – December 1720), was Intendant of New France from 1686 to 1702.  He was the son of Jean Bochart de Champigny, intendant of Rouen, and Marie Boivin. He died in Havre-de-Grâce.

See also 

Louis Levasseur
Charles Bécart de Granville et de Fonville

References 

 
 the Canadian Encyclopedia

1645 births
1720 deaths
Intendants of New France
French Ministers of Finance